In Hindu mythology, the danavas are a race descending from Kashyapa and his wife Danu, a daughter of the progenitor god, Daksha. It is mentioned that there are one hundred danavas.

Origin 
The danavas are a mythological race of asuras, the half-brothers to the devas and daityas that are found in a range of Hindu texts. The danavas are a part of a larger group of the asuras, and are typically portrayed as opposed to the Hindu deities. However, historically, their role in Hinduism is varied and at times, the distinction between the danavas and Hindu deities is complex and they are difficult to distinguish from one another.

Etymology 
The name danavas stems from the mother's name: Danu. Both danavas and Danu are derived from the Vedic word Da meaning 'to give.' Ananda Coomaraswamy suggests this word connotes generosity. Another interpretation of their name is associated with Danu's relationship with her first son (and demon), Vritra. In Indian mythology, in an attempt to deceive the Vedic god Indra, Vritra hides away in the primordial water or blessed water from him. In this myth, Danu herself is embodied as being the primordial water in which he hides in. The names of Danu and danavas as well as the individual names given to many of the sons of Danu differ across Vedic and Puranic literature, causing confusion as to where their etymological origins lie.

Story 
The devas exiled the danavas from Svarga during the Satya Yuga. After the exile, the danavas are held to have taken refuge in the Vindhya range.

Genealogy 
The genealogical history of asuras is laid out in a range of texts, most notably in the Mahabharata. The genealogy of the demons or asuras begins with Brahma's six sons. One son, Marichi, fathered Kashyapa, who married thirteen of Daksha's daughters, including Diti and Danu. Diti and Danu's children are among the most well-known demons in Hindu mythology. Diti's children are known as the daityas and Danu's offspring are known as the danavas. It is important to note that the names of danavas and the daityas are irregularly found and depicted throughout early Vedic literature such as the Rig Veda along with the Mahabharata. The Brill's Encyclopedia of Hinduism states, "... in the Mahābhārata Vṛtra is the son of Danāyu, (and) the Ṛigveda (1.32.9) speaks of Vṛtra as the son of Danu." However, in books 2-7 of the Rig Veda, Vrta is not considered an asura or demon, and there is no mention of Danu or the danavas at all.

 Brahma
 Marici 
 Kashyapa
 Danu
 Ashva
 Ashvagiri
 Ashvagriva 
 Ashvapati
 Ashvasanku
 Ashvasiras
 Ayumukha
 Danayu 
 Dirghajibha
Ekacakra
 Ekaksha
 Gaganamurdhana
 Gavisthar 
 Hara
 Isrpa
 Kabandha 
 Kapata (or Vegavat)
 Kabila 
 Karambha 
 Kesin
 Ketumat
 Kupatha
 Maydanav
 Mrtapa
 Naraka 
 Nichandra 
 Nikumbha 
 Pralambha 
 Puloman
 Rambha
 Salabha 
 Sankara
 Sankusiras 
 Sarabha 
 Satha
 Satrutpana 
 Swarbhanu
 Tuhundra 
 Viprachitti 
 Vritra

At other times, the genealogical roots of the demons are not emphasised. Demons are sometimes depicted as ancestral, deceased beings who had been mistreated in their human lifetime by relatives who had not performed the proper and correct funeral rites for these beings in their human form.

Physical appearance
The daityas and the danavas share the same physical features and characteristics as their counterparts, the devas. In Hindu religion, the power of Maya or the power of illusion is possessed by both good and evil supernatural beings. The power of illusion allows beings to change their physical form. Despite their extensive role in certain texts, there are not many examples of the physical characteristics of the danavas in their own right or even in conjunction with devas in literature and art.

Literature
The extensive research into the supernatural beings of Hinduism focuses on their ambiguity. Both good and bad supernatural beings demonstrate malevolent, powerful, yet merciful personalities. Therefore, at times, it is difficult to discern between the roles of oppositional beings. This is particularly evident in earlier Vedic literature where there is not an emphasis on the oppositional qualities of these beings. In many myths or hymns, they perform identical actions to one another. Subsequently, the danavas's role is hardly distinguished or mentioned in Vedic literature. O'Flaherty and Doniger state that in later literature like the Mahabharata, these beings are slowly considered a part of "... two separate castes; each has his own job to do – the gods to encourage sacrifice, the demons to destroy it – but there is no immorality in the demons; they are merely doing their job, a destructive one..." While, in the earlier Vedic period, themes of caste-based structures of worship were not prominent.

Myths

Natyashastra
In the Natyashastra, the danavas are depicted as evil demons, meddling with dancers. Particularly, in the first chapter of the Natyashastra, the danavas freeze and stop the performance of the dancers during an important event dedicated to the Hindu deities. Angering the deities, the danavas are attacked and defeated by Indra and an enclosed, safe dance arena is created for the dancers. Afterwards, dance-dramas depicting the defeat of the danavas are performed at the arena and anger the demons further. The danavas protestations are reserved for Brahma, the god of creation. Brahma advises the danavas that dance drama allows participants and viewers to become divine or a part of the gods in unison. Therefore, some scholars interpret Brahma's reply as the important role dance plays in worship.

Indra-Vrita myth 
The Indra-Vrita myth is the only known myth that contains a prominent son of Danu, a member of the danavas. These myths are what later cement the rivalry of the devas and asuras. The struggle between Indra and Vrita act as a, "cosmogonic myth" as it discusses the birth of sat ('order') from asat ('chaos').

Mayasura

Mayasura is a prominent member of the danavas and is extensively found throughout the Mahabharata. He was known to be a popular architect and rival to the architect to the gods, Vishvakarma. He is also known for being the father-in-law to Ravana, a prominent antagonist in Hindu Mythology. He wrote the Surya Siddhanta. However, he is most known for his architecture. In the Sabha Parva of the Mahabharata, Maya danava built the 'Maya Sabha', or the palace of illusions for the Pandava brothers. Here, Mayasura asked Arjuna for guidance and advised he wished to built something of value for him and the Pandavas. After Arjuna and Vaisampayana discuss what should be built, Krishna advised Maya to build a godlike palace. As translated by Ganguli, Krishna contemplates and announces what he desires. Maya is referred to being the son of Diti, despite being addressed as Maya danava during the entirety of Book 2.

Elsewhere, Mayasura built Tripura, also known as the three cities of gold, silver, and iron. He also built the city of Lankapuri in Lanka.

See also 

Asura
Daitya
Dewi Danu
Rakshasa
Kalakeyas
List of Asuras
Nivatakavacha
Nāga
Bhagavata Purana
Denyen
Tuatha Dé Danann
Danube River Danu-be
Tribe of Dan
Kukulkan
Danaïdes

Notes

External links

 
Characters in Hindu mythology